The Fall is a 2008 independent crime film written and directed by John Krueger, starring Benjamin Ciaramello, Scott Kinworthy, and Erica Shaffer.

Plot
Two brothers, Tony (Benny Ciaramello and Robert Gerdisch as young Tony) and Frank "Butchie" Jakubiak (Scott Kinworthy and Matthew Gold as young Butchie), are forced to face a terrible and hidden crime that comes from their past.

Cast

Production
The Fall was filmed in Los Angeles and Milwaukee.

Release
The Fall premiered at the Rome Film Festival in September 2008.

Home media
The film has been released in DVD format for home entertainment in 2010, distributed by Osiris Entertainment for the United States and Peacock Films for Australia.

External links

2000s crime films
2008 films
American independent films
American crime films
2008 independent films
2000s English-language films
2000s American films